Ardley railway station was a railway station serving the village of Ardley in Oxfordshire, England. It was on what is now known as the Chiltern Main Line, south of Ardley Tunnel.

History

Ardley was one of six new stations that the Great Western Railway provided when it opened the high-speed Bicester cut-off line between Princes Risborough and Kings Sutton in 1910. It was the last station under the jurisdiction of the London District of the GWR on this route. The line became part of the Western Region of British Railways on nationalisation in 1948. British Railways closed Ardley station in 1963, but in an odd oversight, Ardley continued to appear in the weekly special traffic notices of the London Midland Region right up until 1982, nineteen years after its closure.

The site today

Trains of the Chiltern Main Line pass the site.

References

 
 
 Station on navigable O.S. map.

Disused railway stations in Oxfordshire
Former Great Western Railway stations
Railway stations in Great Britain opened in 1910
Railway stations in Great Britain closed in 1963